Rocker or rockers may refer to:

Places
Rocker, Montana, a neighborhood in Butte, Montana, United States

People
Rocker, a British drummer, formerly of The Flatmates
Fermin Rocker (1907–2004), painter and illustrator
John Rocker (born 1974), American Major League Baseball pitcher
Kumar Rocker (born 1999), American Major League Baseball pitcher
Lee Rocker (born 1961), stage name of American rockabilly musician Leon Drucker
Rudolf Rocker (1873–1958), German writer, historian and prominent anarchist
Tracy Rocker (born 1966), American college football coach and former player

Arts, entertainment, and media

Films  
Rocker (1972 film), a 1972 German film
Rockers (1978 film), a 1978 Jamaican film
Rockers (2003 film), a 2003 Japanese film
The Rocker (film), a 2008 American film

Music

Groups
The Rockers (band), a Japanese punk rock band
Barbie and the Rockers (branded in Europe as Barbie and the Rock Stars), a doll line made by Mattel
Bombay Rockers, a Danish/Indian band
Dolly Rockers, an English pop group
Fast Food Rockers, a British pop group
Jesse & The Rockers, an American Christian pop punk band
Looptroop Rockers, a Swedish hip hop group
Raga Rockers, a Norwegian rock band
Red Rockers, an American punk rock and New Wave band
Rockers (band), a short-lived british-irish pub rock band
Rockers Revenge, a studio musical project assembled by producer Arthur Baker
She Rockers, a female hip hop trio from London

Albums  
Rocker (album), a 2002 album by Kraljevski Apartman
Rockers (Styx album)
Rockers (Slade album)
Rockers (soundtrack), a 1979 film soundtrack

Songs
"Rocker" (song), a song by AC/DC
"Rocker", a 2004 single from Alter Ego
"Rocker", a song composed by Gerry Mulligan and recorded by Miles Davis and by Charlie Parker
"Rocker", a song by The 69 Eyes 
"The Rocker" (song), a 1973 song by Thin Lizzy

Other uses in music
Rocker, an individual or band that performs rock music
Rockers, a variation of the one drop rhythm drumbeat in reggae music
Pocket Rockers, a brand of music player produced by Fisher-Price

Other uses in arts, entertainment, and media
Rocker, a Boston-based music magazine founded in 2011, targeted to ages 35 and up
 Rockers (play), a 1993 play by Sherwood Schwartz

Motorcycling
Rocker (subculture), a British biker subculture that originated in the 1950s/1960s, also known as "Ton Up Boy" and "Greaser"
Rocker, a generic term for outlaw motorcycle club style motorcyclists in Germany
Rocker, the top and bottom parts of a "backpatch" or "colors" often worn by a member of a motorcycle club

Science and engineering 
 Rocker (laboratory), a device used for mixing applications
 Rocker, a cradle mechanism formerly used in placer mining
 Rocker, a metal tool with small teeth used in mezzotint printmaking
 Rocker, the rise or curve of a vessel's hull along its keel line (for example in a kayak)
 Rocker, a rocking chair or one of the curved bands which support it
Rocker arm, part of a 4-stroke engine
 Rocker panel, the body section of a vehicle below the door openings
Rocker switch for switching between two states of an electrical device

Sports teams and terminology
Cincinnati Rockers, an Arena Football League team
Cleveland Rockers, a Women's National Basketball Association (WNBA) team
Detroit Rockers, an indoor soccer team in the National Professional Soccer League
High Point Rockers, a team in the Atlantic League of Professional Baseball
Rocker turn, a turn in figure skating
SunRockers Tokyo-Shibuya, Japanese professional basketball team
The Rockers, a professional wrestling tag team
Rocker, in skiing, see ski geometry

See also

 Rock (disambiguation)
 Rockery (disambiguation)